The Clarksburg Micropolitan Statistical Area, as defined by the United States Census Bureau, is an area consisting of three counties in North-Central West Virginia, anchored by the city of Clarksburg.

As of the 2000 census, the μSA had a population of 92,144 (though a July 1, 2009 estimate placed the population at 92,441).

Counties
Doddridge
Harrison
Taylor

Communities
Places with 10,000 or more inhabitants
Clarksburg (Principal city)
Places with 5,000 to 10,000 inhabitants
Bridgeport

Places with 1,000 to 5,000 inhabitants
Despard
Nutter Fort
Salem
Shinnston
Stonewood
Grafton
Places with less than 1,000 inhabitants
Anmoore
Enterprise
Flemington
Lost Creek
Lumberport
West Milford
West Union

Unincorporated places
Astor
Belgium
Blueville
Brownlow
Center Point
Elliotsville
Fetterman
Hepzibah
Knottsville
Lucretia
McGee
Meadland
Millertown
New Milton
Oreide
Park View
Pruntytown
Rosemont
Santiago
Simpson
Smithburg
South Grafton
Tappan
Thornton
Webster
Wendel
West Grafton

Demographics
As of the census of 2000, there were 92,144 people, 37,032 households, and 25,677 families residing within the μSA. The racial makeup of the μSA was 96.96% White, 1.37% African American, 0.17% Native American, 0.48% Asian, 0.03% Pacific Islander, 0.18% from other races, and 0.82% from two or more races. Hispanic or Latino of any race were 0.86% of the population.

The median income for a household in the μSA was $28,143, and the median income for a family was $33,198. Males had a median income of $28,991 versus $20,825 for females. The per capita income for the μSA was $14,666.

See also
West Virginia census statistical areas

References

 
Harrison County, West Virginia
Doddridge County, West Virginia
Taylor County, West Virginia